The inaugural West Yorkshire mayoral election was held on Thursday 6 May 2021 to elect the Mayor of West Yorkshire. It took place simultaneously on the same day as other local elections across the United Kingdom, including council elections in each of the five metropolitan boroughs of West Yorkshire.

It was conducted using the supplementary vote (SV) electoral system. The new mayor would chair and lead the West Yorkshire Combined Authority, and incorporate the previous responsibilities of the police and crime commissioner for West Yorkshire, with the latter being abolished.

The contest was the first election for a governing body for the West Yorkshire region since the last West Yorkshire County Council election in 1981, before the county council's abolition in 1986. An initial three-year term was granted for the inaugural mayor, with four-year terms thereafter.

Background
The West Yorkshire Combined Authority (WYCA) was first proposed in 2012 as part of the City Deal for the Leeds City Region. It was negotiated between the coalition government, Leeds City Region Enterprise Partnership and the five West Yorkshire boroughs of Bradford, Calderdale, Kirklees, Leeds and Wakefield. The combined authority was established on 1 April 2014, following a public consultation and statutory approval on 31 March 2014. There was support from the five boroughs for a "One Yorkshire" proposal, which would have elected a mayor for the entire Yorkshire region. However it was rejected by the government in 2019.

The devolution deal was formally signed on 12 March 2020 in the Nexus building at the University of Leeds. After further negotiations, the Chancellor of the Exchequer Rishi Sunak announced in the March 2020 UK budget that the government and the West Yorkshire authorities had agreed a proposed West Yorkshire devolution deal.

The mayor's role includes handling of a £38 million a year investment from central government for 30 years. The mayor has control over regional transport (including creating a regional mass transit system), housing, land (with responsibility for creating a city region spatial plan) and adult skills. Though the role was initially planned to absorb the responsibilities of the West Yorkshire Police and Crime Commissioner – similar to the mayor of London and the mayor of Greater Manchester- in 2024. Changes in January 2021 meant that the role was being incorporated into the Mayor's office for May 2021.

Prior to the election, the Labour Party had control of all five boroughs of the city-region. However, in the 2019 general election, Labour lost four seats in West Yorkshire to the Conservative Party.

Results

Results by local authority

Bradford

Calderdale

Kirklees

Leeds

Wakefield

Candidates

Conservative Party 
Matthew Robinson was selected by party members as the Conservative Party's candidate on 20 February 2021. Robinson, a Leeds City Councillor for Harewood ward, had been the party's candidate for the cancelled 2021 West Yorkshire Police and Crime Commissioner election and prospective parliamentary candidate for Leeds East in 2017. He defeated Narinder Sekhon for the nomination, a barrister and parliamentary candidate for Bradford South in 2019.

It had previously been speculated that Ken Davy, businessman and the party's former candidate for Huddersfield in 2019, could potentially stand in the election. Baroness Sayeeda Warsi, peer and former co-chair of the Conservative Party, declined to stand.

Green Party 

Andrew Cooper, the leader of the Green Party group on Kirklees Council and councillor for Newsome ward, was announced as the Green Party's mayoral candidate on 16 September 2020. Cooper was parliamentary candidate for Huddersfield in 2010, 2015, 2017 and 2019. Hawarun Hussain, a former Bradford Councillor for Shipley ward, was also confirmed as the party's candidate for deputy mayor.

During the final public round of selection process, Cooper received 58% of party members' votes, defeating Hussain in second place with 42% of the vote. Lyn Morton, the party's parliamentary candidate in 2019 for Hemsworth, was eliminated in the earlier selection process.

Labour Party 

Tracy Brabin, the former MP for Batley and Spen, a former actor and television writer, was announced as the Labour and Co-operative candidate on 11 December 2020 following a ballot of party members. Upon her selection, Brabin resigned as Shadow Minister for the Cultural Industries and would step down as an MP when elected. She defeated Susan Hinchcliffe, the chair of the West Yorkshire Combined Authority, the leader of Bradford Council and councillor for Windhill and Wrose ward, and Hugh Goulbourne, solicitor and the chair of the Huddersfield branch of the Co-operative Party.

Labour opened candidate nominations in October 2020, with a deadline for self-nomination on 14 October. To progress to the next interview stage, each candidate required a nomination from at least two Constituency Labour Parties or two affiliated groups by 8 November. A joint committee of the party's National Executive Committee and the Regional Executive Committee then selected a shortlist of Brabin, Goulbourne and Hinchcliffe to be voted on and selected in a ballot of party members.

Peter Judge, a former Calderdale Councillor, nominated himself but was not short-listed. Paula Sherriff, the former MP for Dewsbury, had announced her intention to stand as a candidate but later withdrew in March 2020 due to receiving treatment for breast cancer.

Endorsements

Liberal Democrats
Stewart Golton, the leader of the Liberal Democrat group on Leeds City Council, was announced as the Liberal Democrat candidate on 17 December 2020. Golton is a councillor for Rothwell ward and former parliamentary candidate for Elmet and Rothwell in 2010, 2015, 2017 and 2019.

Yorkshire Party
Bob Buxton, the leader of the Yorkshire Party, was announced as the party's candidate on 11 August 2020. Buxton is a Rawdon Parish Councillor and was the party's parliamentary candidate for Pudsey in 2017 and 2019.

Prior speculated candidates
There was prior speculation around additional individuals, who did not eventually stand:

 Michelle Dewberry, businessperson, media personality and parliamentary candidate for Hull West and Hessle in 2017 and 2019 to stand for the Reform UK party (formerly The Brexit Party)
 Bernard Hogan-Howe, peer and former head of the Metropolitan Police and Commissioner of Police of the Metropolis
 Anne Longfield, Children's Commissioner for England
 Roger Marsh, chair of the Leeds City Region Local Enterprise Partnership

References

West Yorkshire
Elections in West Yorkshire
Mayoral elections in England
2020s in West Yorkshire